The first series of the British medical drama television series Holby City commenced airing in the United Kingdom on BBC One on 12 January 1999, and concluded on 9 March 1999. The show was created by Mal Young and Tony McHale as a spin–off from the BBC medical drama Casualty, intended to follow the treatment of patients from Casualty as they were transferred onto the hospital's surgical wards. McHale served as the programme's lead writer throughout the first series, which ran for nine episodes. Young cast actors who were already established names in the acting industry, particularly from a soap opera background. Several cast members shadowed real surgeons and nurses in preparation for their roles to increase the show's realism. The series received mixed reviews from critics. It was compared favourably with Casualty, but received negative reviews in which it was contrasted poorly with the American medical drama ER. The series première attracted 10.72 million viewers, falling to 8.51 million by the series finale. 

The series focuses on the hospital's cardithoracic ward, Darwin. Department heads and consultant surgeons Anton Meyer (George Irving) and Muriel McKendrick (Phyllis Logan) clash frequently over patient care and division of beds. Tension arises between nurses Julie Fitzjohn (Nicola Stephenson) and Jasmine Hopkins (Angela Griffin) over the position of Darwin ward sister. Registrar Nick Jordan (Michael French) clashes professionally with his estranged wife Karen Newburn (Sarah Preston), and pursues relationships with registrar Kirstie Collins (Dawn McDaniel) and theatre sister Ellie Sharpe (Julie Saunders). Ward clerk Paul Ripley (Luke Mably) resigns after being caught kissing a comatose patient, and house officer Victoria Merrick (Lisa Faulkner) begins taking amphetamines to cope with the pressures of work. In the series finale, Jasmine is stabbed by thieves, and Nick endeavours to save her life in theatre.

Production

Holby City was created by Tony McHale and Mal Young as a spin–off from the long–running BBC medical drama Casualty. Young wanted to explore what happened to patients treated in Casualty once they were taken away to the hospital's surgical wards. While Casualty scope is limited to "accident of the week" storylines about patients entering hospital, Holby City allowed the possibility of storylines about long–term care, rather than immediate life and death decisions. 

Although both shows are set in the same hospital, the Casualty set in Bristol was not large enough to encompass the surgical ward and operating theatre required for Holby City, so the series was produced at the BBC Elstree Centre just north of London. As a result, some crossover scenes had to be shot twice, first on the Casualty set and then again at Elstree, with cast members travelling between the two locations. McHale wrote the series' first episode, and served as the show's lead writer. Holby City premiered on 12 January 1999 on BBC One. Its first series ran for nine episodes of 50 minutes in length, which were broadcast first in the 8.10 pm, then 8 pm timeslot on Tuesdays.

Cast

Overview 
The first series of Holby City featured an ensemble cast of characters in the medical profession, who worked on the hospital's Darwin Ward. Phyllis Logan and George Irving played consultants Muriel McKendrick and Anton Meyer. Michael French and Dawn McDaniel appeared as registrars Nick Jordan and Kirstie Collins, while Lisa Faulkner played senior house officer Victoria Merrick. Sarah Preston and Angela Griffin played ward sisters Karen Newburn and Jasmine Hopkins. Nicola Stephenson appeared as nurse Julie Fitzjohn, and Ian Curtis played senior staff nurse Ray Sykes. Julie Saunders played theatre sister Ellie Sharpe, and Luke Mably appeared as ward clerk Paul Ripley. Logan, Saunders and Mably all departed from Holby City during the course of the series. The series also included walk–on performances by Casualty cast members, including Derek Thompson as nurse Charlie Fairhead, and guest appearances by characters first seen in Casualty, whose treatment was continued on Holby City.

In casting the first series of Holby City, Young—who had previously worked on the soap operas Brookside and Family Affairs—selected actors who were already established names in the acting industry, particularly from a soap opera background. French had starred in the BBC's EastEnders, while Stephenson and Faulkner had starred in Brookside. Griffin had also appeared in ITV's Coronation Street. Young explained: "Some of the best performances on screen have come out of soaps in the past few years. There is a fantastic amount of talent on those shows."

Cast members observed the staff at real hospitals in preparation for their roles. Stephenson and Griffin spent time at Watford Hospital, where they underwent a crash course in nursing basics, including handling bed pans and learning to make beds with hospital corners. Irving observed coronary artery bypass surgery performed at Papworth and Middlesex Hospital, while French shadowed a consultant and registrar at Papworth Hospital, observing a heart bypass and lung biopsy procedure. Young explained that viewers believe in Casualty and trust the show to be realistic, and that he wanted Holby City to be the same in that regard.

Main characters 
Ian Curtis as Ray Sykes
Lisa Faulkner as Victoria Merrick (from episode 2)
Michael French as Nick Jordan
Angela Griffin as Jasmine Hopkins
George Irving as Anton Meyer
Phyllis Logan as Muriel McKendrick (episodes 2−9)
Luke Mably as Paul Ripley (until episode 2)
Dawn McDaniel as Kirstie Collins
Sarah Preston as Karen Newburn (from episode 2)
Julie Saunders as Ellie Sharpe (until episode 9)
Nicola Stephenson as Julie Fitzjohn

Recurring and guest characters 
Jan Anderson as Chloe Hill (episode 1−2)
Alex Avery as Carl (from episode 5)
Fraser James as Peter Ellis (episodes 1 and 6)
Vincenzo Pellegrino as Derek "Sunny" Sunderland (episodes 1−2, 8−9)
Derek Thompson as Charlie Fairhead (episode 1)
Jonathan Kerrigan as Sam Colloby (episode 2)
Susan Cookson as Julie Day (episode 9)
Claire Goose as Tina Seabrook (episode 3)

Reception

The series received mixed reviews from critics. Graham Keal of the Birmingham Post wrote of the first episode: "Heretical as it might seem, I liked Holby City more than Casualty, not least because the formula is so much more flexible and unpredictable." The Mirror Charlie Catchpole wrote that he was "sick of the sensitive, hand–wringing, non–judgmental do–gooders who mope around the A&E department in Casualty", praising in comparison the "pushy, ambitious, cynical and generally thoroughly unpleasant surgeons" in Holby City. 

Sam Wollaston of The Guardian received the series positively, writing: "Holby City has everything you want from a hospital drama: good–looking staff, a bit of love interest, a dishy doc, the odd current issue (no beds, badly–paid nurses) and bits where you have to look away", deeming it: "Pretty good, really." Kathleen Morgan of the Daily Record praised the casting of French and Griffin, writing: "It will take a couple of episodes before both actors shake off their soapy history, but with some decent plots and good lines, they should make the grade." Morgan deemed Irving the star of the show, and commented: "With Irving in the driving seat, Holby City looks like it is on the right track." 

Andrew Billen of the New Statesman also found Irving as Meyer the series' "most compelling character", though deemed Holby City mediocre and its storylines "safely unoriginal". Billen compared Holby City negatively to the American medical drama ER, opining that the former show has a meandering pace in comparison to the latter's briskness, and that ER has a higher calibre of actors. The Sunday Herald also compared the series unfavourably to ER, writing that Holby City served to highlight ER "true sophistication". Morgan refuted these negative comparisons, however, writing that: "The sign of great drama is when a scriptwriter and director can make a symphony out of a few notes and Holby City creators have done that. It doesn't have the budget of ER, but it is proving just as compelling."

Episodes

References

External links
 Holby City series 1  at BBC Online
 Holby City series 1 at the Internet Movie Database

01
1999 British television seasons